Alerding may refer to:

 Herman Joseph Alerding, Roman Catholic Bishop of Fort Wayne
 Alerding v. Ohio High School Athletic Association, a court case before the United States Court of Appeals for the Sixth Circuit